This Timeless Turning is an album by Sky Cries Mary. It was released in 1994 through World Domination Recordings.

Release
To promote the album, Sky Cries Mary broadcast a complete concert live on the internet, the first band to ever do so.

Critical reception
AllMusic called This Timeless Turning the band's masterpiece.

Track listing

Personnel 
Sky Cries Mary
Michael Cozzi – guitar
Juano Davison – bass guitar
Ben Ireland – drums, percussion
Gordon Raphael – guitar, synthesizer, sampler, organ
Todd Robbins – sampler, turntables, vocoder, synthesizer, drum machine
Anisa Romero – vocals, harmonium, painting
Roderick Wolgamott Romero – vocals, synthesizer
Production and additional personnel
Tom Baker – mastering
Robin Boomer – cello
Ian Caple – production, engineering, mixing
Ophelia Chong – art direction
Larry Halpern – soprano saxophone, flute
Serge – didgeridoo
Sky Cries Mary – production
Dee Young – cover art

References

External links 
 

1994 albums
Sky Cries Mary albums